In gambling and economics, the favourite-longshot bias is an observed phenomenon where on average, bettors tend to overvalue "longshots" and relatively undervalue favourites. That is, in a horse race where one horse is given odds of 2-to-1, and another 100-to-1, the true odds might for example be 1.5-to-1 and 300-to-1 respectively. Betting on the "longshot" is therefore a much worse proposition than betting on the favourite. In the long run, losing 5% by betting on the favourite, but losing 40% on longshots is not uncommon. Various theories exist to explain why people willingly bet on such losing propositions, such as risk-loving behavior, risk-averse behavior or simply inaccurate estimation as presented by Sobel and Raines.

See also
Rank-dependent expected utility

References

Financial risk
Sports betting